is a Japanese female volleyball player. She was part of the Japan women's national volleyball team.

She competed at the 2013 FIVB Volleyball World Grand Prix.
On club level she played for Okayama Seagulls in 2013.

References

External links
 Profile at FIVB.org
http://www.alamy.com/stock-photo-aimi-kawashima-jpnaugust-16-2013-volleyball-2013-fivb-world-grand-59775424.html
https://www.jva.or.jp/en/senior_women/
http://nipponnews.photoshelter.com/gallery/Volleyball-2013-FIVB-World-Grand-Prix-Preliminary-Round-Week-3-Pool-M/G0000SG_iFpAgVH8/1/C0000gWqrR.yyQRc
http://www.japantimes.co.jp/sports/2013/08/30/more-sports/serbia-spikers-size-proves-problematic-for-japan-at-net/#.WM2F71XyvIU

1990 births
Living people
Japanese women's volleyball players
Place of birth missing (living people)